"The Adventure of the Gloria Scott ", one of the 56 Sherlock Holmes short stories written by Sir Arthur Conan Doyle, is one of 12 stories in the cycle collected as The Memoirs of Sherlock Holmes. It was first published in The Strand Magazine in the United Kingdom in April 1893, and in Harper's Weekly in the United States on 15 April 1893.

It is chronologically the earliest case in Sherlock Holmes canon. This story is related mainly by Holmes rather than Watson, and is the first case to which Holmes applied his powers of deduction, having treated it as a mere hobby until this time. This is one of numerous Sherlock Holmes stories in which a protagonist is haunted by an old acquaintance for an old crime. The others include "The Boscombe Valley Mystery" "Black Peter", "The Sign of Four", "The Five Orange Pips", "The Resident Patient", etc. It is also one of his many stories that deal with the fate of characters who return to England after having spent time abroad in the colonies of the British Empire.

Synopsis

In his university days, Holmes spent a month with his friend, Victor Trevor, at Victor's father's estate in Norfolk. While there, Holmes amazed his host, Victor's father, who was a Justice of the Peace and a landowner. He had made his fortune in the goldfields in Australia. One of Holmes's deductions was that the elder Mr. Trevor was once connected with someone with the initials "J. A." whom he wanted to forget. His host then passed out on the table. Holmes had touched a sore spot, and possibly did not believe the old man's explanation once he had come back to himself that J. A. had been an old lover.

Holmes perceived that he was making his host uncomfortable and decided to take his leave. The evening before he did this, another old man suddenly appeared at the house causing the elder Mr. Trevor to rush for a shot of brandy before greeting him. They had apparently been shipmates some 30 years earlier, and Mr. Trevor said something about finding him some work. Soon afterwards, Holmes and his friend found Mr. Trevor drunk.

Holmes then left the Trevor estate and spent the next seven weeks at his chemistry experiments, suddenly receiving a telegram from the younger Trevor begging him to come back to Norfolk. Once he got there, Victor told Holmes that his father was dying as a result of a stroke suffered after he received a letter. They found that he had died while Victor had been meeting Holmes at the station.

After Holmes had left the house seven weeks earlier, it seems that this old man who had come looking for work, and whose name was Hudson, proved to be as unruly an employee as could be imagined. He had demanded to be promoted from gardener to butler and had got what he wanted. He had taken unforgivable liberties which would normally have resulted in an employee's dismissal. He was often drunk. Victor could not stand him and would have beaten Hudson up if he had been younger. The other staff had complained about him. However, Victor's father always let him get away with any infamy. Suddenly, Hudson announced that he was leaving because he had tired of Norfolk, and he was going to Hampshire to see Beddoes, another old shipmate.

Now, Holmes's friend had become thin and careworn by the ordeal. He had thought that the trouble was over when Hudson had left, but then came the letter, from Fordingbridge in Hampshire. It read:

"The supply of game for London is going steadily up. Head-keeper Hudson, we believe, has been now told to receive all orders for fly-paper and for preservation of your hen pheasant's life."

It meant nothing to Victor, and it was quite a while before Holmes saw anything in it. He found the key. If one read every third word beginning with the first, there was an intelligible message: "The game is up. Hudson has told all. Fly for your life."

Holmes had deduced that the game was blackmail. Some guilty secret had been the power that Hudson had held over the elder Mr. Trevor. The old man's dying words to his doctor unlocked the secret. Some papers were found in Mr. Trevor's Japanese cabinet.

The document was a confession. The elder Mr. Trevor had once borne the name James Armitage (initials: J. A.) and had been a criminal having embezzled money from the bank where he worked and been caught. He was sentenced to transportation.

Once on the ship, the Gloria Scott, bound for Australia from Falmouth, Armitage found out from a neighbouring prisoner that there was a conspiracy to take over the ship. The neighbour, Jack Prendergast, had financed the scheme out of the nearly £250,000 in unrecovered money from his crime. Many of the crew, even officers, were in his employ, and even the chaplain Wilson, who was not truly a clergyman at all. Wilson, while pretending to minister to the prisoners, was actually furnishing them with pistols and other equipment to be used when the time was right. Armitage also drew his other neighbour, Evans, into the scheme.

As might be expected, all did not go as planned. The takeover was accomplished unexpectedly when the ship's doctor discovered a pistol while treating a prisoner. The prisoners then had to make their move right away or they would lose the element of surprise. In the ensuing mêlée, the Captain and many other men were killed, and there arose a dispute between Prendergast with his supporters and a group including Armitage over what to do with the few loyal crewmen still left alive. Armitage and others would not stand for cold-blooded murder. They were cast adrift in a small boat to make their way as they would.

Shortly after leaving in their small boat, the Gloria Scott blew up as the result of the violence spreading to where the gunpowder was kept. The men in the small boat, among whom was also Evans, hurried back to the site and rescued one survivor—Hudson.

The next day, as luck would have it, the men were rescued by another ship, the Hotspur, also bound for Australia. They passed themselves off as survivors from a passenger ship and once in Australia, headed for the goldfields. Armitage changed his name to Trevor, and Evans changed his name to Beddoes. Both later returned to England as rich men.

All had gone well until Hudson had suddenly shown up.

Since no scandal involving the Gloria Scott ever followed the odd message from Beddoes (Evans), and since neither Hudson nor Evans was ever heard from again, the Police believed Hudson had done away with Beddoes while Holmes believed that Evans had likely killed Hudson, believing that he had told all, when in fact he had not, and then fled with as much money as he could lay his hands on.

The case is referenced by Holmes once more in "The Adventure of the Sussex Vampire" when Holmes consults an index of his past exploits for references to "vampires" and remarks on "the Voyage of the Gloria Scott" listed under "V". It is also mentioned in passing in "The Adventure of the Musgrave Ritual" as Holmes recounts to Watson his early cases when he first became a detective.

Discrepancy
The confession account contained a scribbled footnote from the elder Trevor that recorded the fatal note delivered to him. This contradicts the stated fact that Trevor never regained consciousness until the very end of his life, at which time he merely revealed where the confession lay.

According to Trevor's confession the Gloria Scott left Falmouth "thirty years ago" and precisely in 1855, but that would set Holmes's enquiry in 1885 and not in his college years, as he told Watson. Since further in the story the elder Trevor writes also: "For more than twenty years we have led peaceful and useful lives", we can assume that the exact date is around 1875, which would fit Holmes's reference to his college years. It is also possible that the "thirty years" was a rounding of twenty-five years, which would place the case in 1880.

Publication history
The story was published in the UK in The Strand Magazine in April 1893, and in the US in Harper's Weekly on 15 April 1893. It was also published in the US edition of the Strand in May 1893. The story was published with seven illustrations by Sidney Paget in The Strand Magazine, and with two illustrations by W. H. Hyde in Harper's Weekly. It was included in the short story collection The Memoirs of Sherlock Holmes, which was published in the UK in December 1893 and in the US in February 1894.

Adaptations

Film and television
The story was adapted as a 1923 short film for the Sherlock Holmes Stoll film series, with Eille Norwood as Sherlock Holmes and Hubert Willis as Dr. Watson.

The 1954–1955 Sherlock Holmes television series starring Ronald Howard as Holmes and H. Marion Crawford as Watson loosely adapted the story for its episode "The Case of the Blind Man's Bluff", changing the name of the ship to the "Gloria North". It retains elements from the story, such as a respectable character with a tattoo he has tried to erase but which Holmes observes anyway (in the episode, the tattoo was the initials "G.N." for "Gloria North" rather than "J.A."). The episode was later remade, retaining the plot structure and much of the dialogue, for the 1980 American-Polish series Sherlock Holmes and Dr. Watson starring Geoffrey Whitehead, which was also produced by Sheldon Reynolds.

"The Gloria Scott" was a 2001 episode of the animated series Sherlock Holmes in the 22nd Century, in which the titular prison ship was a spacecraft en route to the Moon.

In the 2014 episode "The Empty Hearse", the first episode of the third series of the BBC television series Sherlock, Dr. Watson's fiancee, Mary Morstan, solves a coded text message on a cellphone by reading every third word. In the fourth series episode "The Final Problem" in 2017, it is revealed that Holmes had a childhood friend named Victor Trevor.

Radio

Edith Meiser adapted the story as an episode of the American radio series The Adventures of Sherlock Holmes with Richard Gordon as Sherlock Holmes and Leigh Lovell as Dr. Watson. The episode aired on 21 January 1932. Other episodes adapted from the story aired on 14 April 1935 (with Louis Hector as Holmes and Lovell as Watson) and 1 October 1936 (with Gordon as Holmes and Harry West as Watson).

Meiser also adapted the story for the American radio series The New Adventures of Sherlock Holmes as an episode with Basil Rathbone as Holmes and Nigel Bruce as Watson, which aired on 28 December 1941.

The story was adapted as an episode of the American radio series CBS Radio Mystery Theater titled "The Gloria Scott". The episode, which starred Kevin McCarthy as Sherlock Holmes and Court Benson as Dr. Watson, first aired in November 1977.

"The Gloria Scott" was dramatised by Vincent McInerney for BBC Radio 4 in 1992, as part of the 1989–1998 radio series starring Clive Merrison as Holmes and Michael Williams as Watson. It featured Simon Treves as Victor and Terence Edmond as Trevor.

A 2008 episode of The Classic Adventures of Sherlock Holmes, a series on the American radio show Imagination Theatre, was adapted from the story, with John Patrick Lowrie as Holmes and Lawrence Albert as Watson.

Print
In 2005, Croatian writer Mima Simić published a short story collection entitled Pustolovine Glorije Scott 
(Adventures of Gloria Scott). This loose adaptation introduces a queer parody of the Sherlock Holmes canon through the gender reversal of the protagonists: disastrous detective Gloria Scott and her faithful assistant Mary Lambert. A TV animation series based on this adaptation was under development as of 2014.

The 2016 book The Murder of Mary Russell by Laurie R. King is based on the premise that Gloria Scott's Hudson is none other than the father of Holmes' landlady Mrs. Hudson.

References
Notes

Sources

External links
 

Gloria Scott, The Adventure of the
1893 short stories
Works originally published in The Strand Magazine
Works originally published in Harper's Weekly